Ishwa' was a Palestinian village which was depopulated during the 1948 Arab-Israeli war. The village was located about 20 km west of Jerusalem, on the present location of Eshta'ol. In the 1931 British census of Palestine, Ishwa had a population of 468 in 126 houses. The village was occupied by the Israel Defense Forces (IDF) on July 16, 1948, in Operation Dani by the Harel Brigade. All of its inhabitants fled or were expelled.

History
Ishwa  was an ancient village, situated at the foot of a hill.

It is thought to have been established over the site of the Israelite city of Eshtaol, famous for the biblical story of Samson. It was known by that name during the Roman Empire era, when it fell within the administrative district of Eleutheropolis (Bayt Jibrin).

Ottoman era
During the 16th century CE, settlement seems to have shifted to the northwest to Islin. During the 17th or 18th century  the site of Islin went out of use, and Ishwa was probably repopulated.

In 1863 the French explorer Victor Guérin visited and found the village to have barely 300 inhabitants. The only ancient remains  was  a ruined arch near the well, which he thought was possibly dated to the Roman period. An Ottoman village list of about 1870 counted 32 houses and a population of  90  in Schu’a, though  the population count included men, only. It was described as being in the Hebron district, just east of Sar'a.

By 1875, it had a population of 450. Ishwa had a star-shaped configuration, its mostly stone houses extending along the roads leading to other villages.

In 1896 the population of Aschuwa'  was estimated to be about 354 persons.

British Mandate era
In the 1922 census of Palestine conducted by the British Mandate authorities, Ishwa had a population of 379, all Muslim. This had increased by the time of the 1931 census to 468, still all Muslim, in 117 houses.

In the 1945 statistics  the population was 620, all Muslims while the total land area was 5,522  dunams, according to an official land and population survey. Of this,  473 were allocated  for plantations and irrigable land, 1,911 for cereals, while 47 dunams were classified as built-up areas.

1948 Arab–Israeli War and aftermath
Ishwa, along with four other villages, were overtaken by the Israeli Harel Brigade on 17–18 July 1948 in Operation Dani. The villages had been on the front line since April 1948 and most of the inhabitants of these villages had already left the area. Many of those who stayed fled when Israeli forces attacked and the few who remained at each village were expelled.

Following the war, the area was incorporated into the State of Israel. In 1949 the moshav of Eshtaol was established on land that had belonged to Ishwa and nearby Islin. 

In 1992 Palestinian historian Walid Khalidi noted that: "Only a few of the village houses remain on the site, interspersed among the settlement's houses; some serve as residences and warehouses. The village cemetery, next to the administrative building of the settlement, has been levelled and planted with grass. On the southern edge of the cemetery is a cave that contains the large grindstone of a flour mill. Olive and carob trees grow on the site, among other trees more recently planted by the settlers. At the western edge of the village is a soccer field. The walls and fallen roofs of the destroyed houses can be seen at the edge of this field."
In 1998, a book about the village was published in Jordan.

See also
List of villages depopulated during the Arab–Israeli conflict

References

Bibliography

 
 
 
 

 
Kan‘aan, Deeb Ahmad. 1998. Ishwa‘: Qarya Filastiniyya [Ishwa‘: A Palestinian village]. Jordan.

External links
Palestine Remembered - Ishwa
Ishwa', Zochrot
Survey of Western Palestine, Map 17:  IAA, Wikimedia commons 
Ishwa from the Khalil Sakakini Cultural Center

Arab villages depopulated during the 1948 Arab–Israeli War
District of Jerusalem